The Gold Coast Local Heritage Register is a heritage register containing a list of culturally-significant places within the City of Gold Coast, Queensland, Australia. Under Section 113 of the Queensland Heritage Act 1992, all local government authorities in Queensland must maintain a local heritage register.

Criteria
Listings on the Gold Coast Local Heritage Register must satisfy one or more of the following criteria: 
 illustrates the evolution or pattern in local history
 has rare, uncommon or endangered aspects of cultural heritage
 aids the knowledge and understanding of local history
 illustrates the important characteristics of a particular class cultural places
 has aesthetic significance
 was very creative or technologically advanced for its period
 has special links to a particular community or cultural group
 has special links to a significant local historical person or organisation

See also
:Category:Gold Coast Local Heritage Register for list of sites on the Gold Coast Local Heritage Register with Wikipedia articles

References

External links
 

 
Local heritage registers in Queensland